Naked News is a Canadian news and entertainment program owned by Naked Broadcasting Network. It features nude female news presenters reading news bulletins derived from news wires. The show's production studio is located in Toronto. There are six daily news programs a week and they are approximately 22 minutes long. The female cast members either read the news fully nude, or disrobe as they present their various segments, including entertainment, sports, movies, food, sex and relationships. Naked News TV! is an offshoot of the web program and is broadcast on pay TV in various countries around the world.

The show recruits women from around the world to appear on a regular basis or as guest reporters. Their auditions, where women try out for the program, is one of the most popular segments and generates the most viewer feedback.  Another popular segment is Naked in the Streets in which a reporter goes topless in the street and asks the public about various topics.

History 

Naked News was conceived by Fernando Pereira and Kirby Stasyna and debuted in December 1999 as a web-based news service featuring an all-female cast. It began with only one anchor, Victoria Sinclair, who worked for the program until 2015. As the show grew, the number of female anchors increased. Roxanne West joined Sinclair as a lead anchor, and other cast members included Holly Weston, April Torres, Lily Kwan, Sandrine Renard, Erin Sherwood, Athena King, Brooke Roberts, Michelle Pantoliano, Erica Stevens, Samantha Page, Christine Kerr and Valentina Taylor, plus guest anchors. The website was popularized entirely by word of mouth, and quickly became a popular web destination. During the height of its popularity, the website was receiving over 6 million unique visitors per month. In the site's early days, the entire newscast could be viewed for free online. The site was initially supported by advertising, but this changed after the collapse of Internet advertising that occurred with the dot-com crash. By 2002, only one news segment could be viewed for free, and by 2004, no free content remained on the website. Beginning in 2005, a nudity-free version of Naked News was available to non-subscribers. Beginning in June 2008, two news segments could be viewed for free. However, this ended in December 2009.

Following the success of The Naked Truth, a similar show on Russian television, Naked News launched Naked News TV!, the first Internet news program to successfully transfer from website to cable television. It was initially broadcast on Viewers Choice in Canada in 2001, and was first broadcast in the United States a few months later by the iN DEMAND cable TV service on its Too Much for TV pay-per-view network that also included Girls Gone Wild. In 2002, it was broadcast in Australia on The Comedy Channel via cable and satellite television platforms Foxtel and Austar. The British channel Sumo TV briefly showed episodes of Naked News, while the free-to-view Playboy One broadcast the show at 9:30pm Mondays-Fridays until its closure in 2008.

Naked News launched a Japanese version of the show in 2006. Japanese broadcasting regulations prohibited the presenters from being fully naked, allowing them only to strip to their underwear. In 2007, the Japanese government changed broadcasting guidelines to prevent the show receiving a subsidy for the section delivered in sign language.

A male version of the show ran from 2001 until 2007. It was created to parallel the female version, but ceased production as it did not enjoy the female version's popularity and fame. Although it was originally targeted towards female viewers (at one point said to be 30% of the website's audience), the male show later promoted itself as news from a gay perspective.

In the media
In 2013, Naked News was the subject of an eight-part documentary series called Naked News Uncovered, which was broadcast on Super Channel in Canada.

The female announcers have been featured in almost every medium including television (CBS Sunday Morning, The Today Show, The View, Sally Jessy Raphaël, and numerous appearances on Entertainment Tonight and ET Insider), newspapers and magazines (TV Guide, Playboy), and as guests on several radio shows, including Howard Stern.

Similar shows 

In the late 1990s, British cable television channel L!VE TV broadcast Tiffani's Big City Tips, in which model Tiffani Banister gave the financial news while stripping to her underwear.

Imitators
 Comédie+ – In 2001, this French cable TV network ran a series promos featuring males and females casually undressing as they read jokes. In 2006 they copied the Naked News format in its entirety in a striptease newscast called Les Nuz, except the anchors keep their bottom underwear on.
 Radio Tango – In 2001 this radio station based in Oslo, Norway began featuring stripping female weather readers in their broadcasts and on their website.
 A very similar phenomenon by the name "Noodie News" appears in Canadian Margaret Atwood's 2003 novel Oryx and Crake.
 Počasíčko (diminutive of "weather") was Czech TV Nova's past-10PM featurette launched in January 1998 where a nude woman (or occasionally, a man) got dressed in clothing appropriate for the next day's weather forecast. This was discontinued after several years and returned as web-only in February 2007. When Nova launched a new online portal in May 2008, it included a "Red News" section causing controversy; asked about the Naked News, they denied securing license and stressed Počasíčko's primacy.
 In June 2009, plans for Naked News Korea were announced. It featured a similar format to the Canadian version but with less nudity. This was later revealed to be a scam. After barely a month of operations, Naked News Korea, which featured topless news anchors, abruptly closed down amid allegations that the CEO, John Chau, disappeared with all of the company's money. Although Chau bought the naming rights from the Naked News, it was never an official subsidiary of the Toronto-based Canadian company.
 In March 2010, students at the University of Cambridge presented a news segment on Cambridge University Television in the nude.
 French spoof news site Les Graves Infos (Serious News) was launched in mid-2009 with a stripping weather girl. The site closed in February 2010.
 In June 2014, a very similar show was released in Venezuela called Desnudando la Noticia (Stripping the News) which is a variant of Naked News.
 In Portugal, a five-minute news bulletin fronted by a naked woman, titled Nutícias, premiered on 22 April 2002 on cable station SIC Radical. The show was canceled in 2003.
 A Finnish copy of the Naked News concept was broadcast on the country's Aluetelevisio cable television channel. The show employed erotic actress Maria Kekkonen as a reporter. A former porn actress, Rakel Liekki, also worked for the show.

Parodies
 A 2005 episode of the satirical New Zealand news show Eating Media Lunch depicted newsreaders fornicating in a parody of Naked News called "Fuck News".

References

External links 

 

1999 Canadian television series debuts
1990s Canadian television news shows
Canadian news websites
Nudity in television
Canadian non-fiction web series
Internet memes
Citytv original programming
2000s Canadian television news shows
Canadian late-night television programming